The 1972 NCAA Division II Men's Soccer Championship (then named the NCAA College Division Men's Soccer Championship) was the inaugural Division II men's college soccer tournament held by the National Collegiate Athletic Association.  Since 1959, all schools had competed in a single division. The SIU Edwardsville Cougars won their first NCAA title in any sport by defeating the Oneonta Red Dragons in the championship game, 1-0.  The final match was played on December 9, 1972, in Edwardsville, Illinois, at SIUE's Cougar Field, which also hosted the Division I College Cup in 1970 and 1975.

Early rounds

Final

Division change 
1972 was the only year that this tournament was known as the "College Division Men's Soccer Championship." In 1973, the NCAA renamed the University Division as Division I and the College Division as Division II.

Several of the teams in the new Division II that placed a high emphasis on their soccer programs, including both SIUE and Oneonta, moved to Division I after only one season, taking advantage of a then-current NCAA rule that allowed a Division II school to play one sport in Division I and a Division I school to play one sport in Division II. As a result, seven of the twenty-four teams in the 1972 College Division tournament were among the twenty-four teams in the 1973 Division I tournament.

Although four of the seven teams have since stepped down to a lower division, five other schools in the 1972 tournament have since moved up to Division I. These are: Akron, Cal State Fullerton, Eastern Illinois, Hartford, and Loyola Maryland.

See also
1972 NCAA University Division Soccer Tournament
1972 NAIA Soccer Championship

References 

NCAA Division II Men's Soccer Championship
NCAA Division II Men's Soccer Championship
NCAA Division II Men's Soccer Championship
NCAA Division II Men's Soccer Championship